Şaşmaz (literally "infallible" in Turkish) is a Turkish surname. Notable people with the surname include:
 Aytaç Şaşmaz (born 1998), Turkish actor and musician
 Necati Şaşmaz, Turkish actor
 Raci Şaşmaz, Turkish film producer, writer and actor
 Vatan Şaşmaz (1975–2017), Turkish actor, and author
 Zübeyr Şaşmaz (born 1982), Turkish film director

Turkish-language surnames